Auburn Enlarged City School District is a school district in Auburn, New York, United States.

The district operates seven schools: Auburn High School, Auburn Junior High School, Casey Park Elementary School, Genesee Elementary School, Herman Avenue Elementary School, Owasco Elementary School, and Seward Elementary School.

Administration 
The District Office is located 78 Thornton Avenue. The current superintendent is Mr. Jeffrey Pirozzolo.

Administrators 
Mr. Jeffrey Pirozzolo-Superintendent
TBD–Assistant Superintendent for Instruction
Mrs. Camille Johnson–Assistant Superintendent for Student Services
Mrs. Sarah Cupelli–Assistant Superintendent for Personnel
Mrs. Lisa Green–District Business Administrator
Mr. Christian Maher–Director of Health, PE and Athletics
Mr. Eric L. Francisco(CBO)-Director of Facilities

Board of Education 
Mr. Ian Phillips–President
Dr. Eli Hernandez–Vice President
Mr. William Andre
Mr. Matteo Bartolotta
Mr. Sam Giangreco
Dr. Rhoda Overstreet-Wilson
Mr. Joseph Sheppard
Mrs. Danielle Wood

Selected Former Superintendents 
Mr. William A. Miller
Mr. John B. Plume–?-2005

Selected Former Assistant Superintendents 
Assignment, previous assignment and reason for departure denoted in parentheses
Mr. Gerald J. Macaluso–1988-1995 (Curriculum, Principal - Mynderse Academy, named Principal of Union Springs Middle School)

Auburn High School 

Auburn High School is located at 250 Lake Ave and serves grades 9 through 12. The current principal is Mr. Brian Morgan, and the current vice principals are Mr. David Treharne, Ms. Madalyn Stowell, and Mr. John Testa.

Auburn Junior High School 

Auburn Junior High School is located at 191 Franklin Street and serves grades 7 and 8. The current principal is Mr. David Oliver and the current assistant principal is Mr. Jon Roberts.

History

Selected former principals 
Ms. Diane Dolcemascolo–?-2008

Casey Park Elementary School 

Casey Park Elementary School is located at 101 Pulaski Street and serves grades K through 6. The current principal is Mrs. Kelly Garback.

Genesee Elementary School 

Genesee Elementary School is located at 244 Genesee Street and serves grades K through 6. The current principal is Ms. Sarah Green.

Former principals 
Mr. Gary Robertson–?-2006
Mr. Howard Seamens–2006-2007

Herman Avenue Elementary School 

Herman Avenue Elementary School is located at 2 North Herman Avenue and serves grades K through 6. The current principal is Mr. Ronald Gorney.

Owasco Elementary School 

Owasco Elementary School is located at 66 Letchworth Street and serves grades K through 6. The current principal is Mrs. Laura Evans.

Selected Former Principals 
Ms. Patricia Palmer–?-2002

William H. Seward Elementary School 

Seward Elementary School is located at 52 Metcalf Drive and serves grades K through 6. The current principal is Mrs. Amy Mahunik.

Selected Former Principals 
Ms. Jo Ann Tharrett

References

External links
Official site

School districts in New York (state)
Education in Cayuga County, New York